Sim Wong Hoo (1955 – 4 January 2023) was a Singaporean inventor and billionaire entrepreneur known for founding Creative Technology, a designer and manufacturer of products for personal computers and personal digital entertainment devices. He served as the chairman and chief executive officer of Creative Technology from 1981 until his death in 2023. Creative Technology is notable for its products such as the Sound Blaster audio card and the Creative ZEN range of audio and media products.

Early life and education
Sim was born into a Zhao'an Hokkien family in the Colony of Singapore. He attended Bukit Panjang Government High School, before graduating from Ngee Ann Technical College (now Ngee Ann Polytechnic) in 1975. After serving his mandatory National Service, Sim worked in the private engineering sector for a year.

Career
On 1 July 1981, with a capital outlay of S$10,000, Sim, along with former schoolmate Ng Kai Wa, opened a computer repair shop in Pearl's Centre, in Chinatown, and founded Creative Technology.

Sim started by developing and selling an add-on memory board for the Apple II computer. Creative Technology subsequently began creating customised PCs adapted for the Chinese language, including enhanced audio capabilities that allowed the devices to produce speech and melodies.

In 1988, Sim established an office in the United States, and began selling Sound Blaster, a stand-alone sound card. It was among the first dedicated audio processing cards widely available to general consumers. Creative Technology dominated the PC audio market until the 2000s, when OEM PCs began to be built with integrated sound boards in the motherboard. Sound Blaster then found itself reduced to a niche product.

In May 2006, Creative Technology filed suit against Apple Inc. for violating their "Zen patent", which pertained to patent infringement with their iPod, iPod nano and iPod mini players. Apple countersued Creative Technology, and then launched a second suit pertaining to icons and data display and entry in such portable devices. In August 2006, Apple announced it would be paying $100,000,000 to Creative Technology to license the hierarchical user interface outlined in the Zen patent.

In late 2011, Sim announced a new product, the HanZpad, at a news conference in Beijing.

Reception 
Sim won accolades from both industry and government for his innovations. He was awarded the Bintang Bakti Masyarakat (Public Service Star) by Singapore in 2001 for outstanding achievements in the business field. He was named in second spot as Asia's Businessman of the Year in January 2001 by Fortune Magazine.

At age 45, he became the youngest billionaire in Singapore. He was also the first person to be named Singapore's Businessman of the Year twice, in 1992 and 1997. In 2002, he was named Person of the Year by the Singapore Computer Society in recognition of his contribution to the IT industry. Sim was considered to be one of the most famous entrepreneurs of Singapore, and formerly chaired Singapore's Technopreneurship 21 Private Sector Committee.

In 1999, Sim released a book entitled Chaotic Thoughts From The Old Millennium, in which he coined and popularised the term "No U-turn syndrome" to describe the stereotypical Singaporean mindset of requiring permission from higher authorities before taking any action.

Personal life 
Sim had given contrarian advice to budding entrepreneurs, one of which is to not get married. He explained that when one gets married and has family, he or she would have family commitments and be less able to take risks. He added that being a bachelor allowed him to take more risks, which resulted in extraordinary results for him.

Sim died on 4 January 2023. Acquaintances did not notice any difference before his death; his family said that he "passed away peacefully."

References

External links 
 Creative Technology, "ZEN Patent"
 Press Release, "Creative Announces Q3 FY06 Financial Results"
 Google Finance, Creative Technology Ltd
 Biography and Image Gallery of Sim Wong Hoo

1955 births
2023 deaths
20th-century Singaporean businesspeople
Singaporean inventors
Singaporean people of Hokkien descent
Ngee Ann Polytechnic alumni
Recipients of the Bintang Bakti Masyarakat
21st-century Singaporean businesspeople
Singaporean business executives
Singaporean billionaires
20th-century inventors
21st-century inventors
People from British Singapore